South Perth is an electoral district of the Legislative Assembly in Western Australia. The district is located in the suburbs immediately south of the Perth central business district.

Although occasionally held by an independent, South Perth has typically been a safe Liberal seat. It had never been won by the Labor Party until Geoff Baker won it for the party at the 2021 election.

Geography
South Perth is made up of affluent waterside areas in Perth's inner south. The district is bounded to the north by the Swan River and to the west and south by the Canning River. A series of roads separates the electorate from neighbouring eastern districts. The seat includes the suburbs of Como, Karawara, Manning, Salter Point, Waterford, as well as parts of the suburbs of Kensington and South Perth.

History
South Perth was first created for the 1901 state election, largely replacing the abolished seat of Canning, and won by William Gordon. However, Canning was re-created for the 1904 election and South Perth abolished, with Gordon transferring to Canning.

South Perth was eventually revived for the 1950 state election and has existed continuously as an electorate since then. In 1950, it was won by Liberal candidate George Yates, previously the member for Canning. He was succeeded after one term by Bill Grayden, initially as an independent but soon after as a Liberal. Grayden had previously been the state member for Middle Swan and the federal member for Swan. Grayden was the member for South Perth for 37 years, finally retiring in 1993.

The seat's next MP was Phillip Pendal, first elected as a Liberal but twice re-elected as an independent. Upon Pendal's retirement at the 2005 state election, the seat returned to the Liberal fold when current member John McGrath was elected as its representative. McGrath held the seat until his own retirement at the 2021 election and was succeeded by Geoff Baker. Baker's win was historic as he became the first Labor candidate to win the seat.

Members for South Perth

Election results

References

External links
 ABC election profiles: 2005 2008
 WAEC district maps: current boundaries, previous distributions

South Perth
1901 establishments in Australia
1904 disestablishments in Australia
1950 establishments in Australia